Anameromorpha pollinosa is a species of beetle in the family Cerambycidae. It was described by Holzschuh in 2009.

References

Lamiini
Beetles described in 2009